La Chapelle is a station on Paris Métro Line 2, on the border of the 10th and 18th arrondissements above the Boulevard de la Chapelle. The station is connected to the Gare du Nord and the Gare du Nord Métro station on lines 4 and 5.

Location
The station is located above Boulevard de la Chapelle at the intersection with Rue du Faubourg-Saint-Denis and Rue Marx-Dormoy.

History

The elevated line 2 station was opened on 31 January 1903 as part of the extension of line 2 from Anvers to Bagnolet (now called Alexandre Dumas). It is named after the Place de la Chapelle, which was named after the Barrière de la Chapelle, a gate built for the collection of taxation as part of the Wall of the Farmers-General; the gate was built between 1784 and 1788 and demolished after 1859. The gate was named after a village that was annexed by Paris in 1860 and was named after a chapel to Saint Genevieve built in the 6th century.

Since 1993, a long connecting corridor has connected it to the underground part of the Gare du Nord.

During the summer of 2012, the station closed for two and a half months in order to replace the original canopies with identical ones, which protect passengers from the weather.

At the end of 2017, access to the station was known to be congested, the RATP agreed to launch preliminary studies to create a third access.

In 2019, 6,534,340 travelers entered this station which places it at the 48th position of the metro stations for its usage.

Project
In a study carried out by the l'Atelier Parisien d'Urbanisme (Parisian Urban Planning Workshop) during May 2012, it hypothesized the possibility of an extension of the tram tracks of the T8 line, southwest of Gare Rosa-Parks, towards the Gare de Paris-Est, using the tracks next to the RER E. It would be carried out as part of the redevelopment of an enlarged area of Paris northeast. It would run alongside the ZAC Pajol, serve the La Chapelle metro station on line 2 and therefore end at the Gare de l'Est.

Passenger services

Access
The station has two entrances to the west end of the station, located on the central reservation of Boulevard de la Chapelle, on either side of the metro viaduct.

There is a connection to Gare du Nord through a tunnel between the metro station and the RER station.

Station layout

Platforms
The station platforms, overhead, located on a viaduct, are a standard configuration with two platforms separated by metro tracks. They are fitted with awnings, like all the elevated stations on the line. The lighting is carried out thanks to two unique light canopies of neon lights. The upper walls are made of transparent stained glass (unlike the other elevated stations of the line, which are frosted) surmounting the lower walls that covered with white and flat ceramic tiles. The platforms, devoid of advertising, are fitted with blue Motte style seats and the name of the station is inscribed in Parisine font on enameled plates.

Bus connections
The station is served by lines 35, 38, 45, 48, 302 and La Traverse Ney-Flandre (519) of the RATP Bus Network and, at night, by line N43 of the Noctilien.

Nearby
The Théâtre des Bouffes du Nord, located on Boulevard de la Chapelle, is opposite the station.

Gallery

References

Roland, Gérard (2003). Stations de métro. D’Abbesses à Wagram. Éditions Bonneton.

Paris Métro stations in the 10th arrondissement of Paris
Paris Métro stations in the 18th arrondissement of Paris
Railway stations in France opened in 1903